In field theory, a branch of mathematics, the isomorphism extension theorem is an important theorem regarding the extension of a field isomorphism to a larger field.

Isomorphism extension theorem 

The proof of the isomorphism extension theorem depends on Zorn's lemma.

References
 D.J. Lewis, Introduction to algebra, Harper & Row, 1965, Chap.IV.12, p.193.

Field (mathematics)
Theorems in abstract algebra